is the name of two separate passenger railway stations located in the city of Nishinomiya, Hyōgo Prefecture, Japan. One is operated by the private transportation company Hanshin Electric Railway and web other by the private transportation company Hankyu Railway.The two stations are connected with a passage.

Lines
It is also served by the Hankyū Imazu Line  for which it is station number HK-21, and is 9.3 kilometers from the terminus of that line at

Hanshin Main Line

Layout
The station operated by Hanshin Railway was elevated in 2001. The station has two side platforms serving a track each on the 3rd level. Ticket gates and ticket machines are located on the 2nd level. The 170-m platforms are servable for the EMUs owned by Hanshin Railway and those by Kintetsu.

History 
The current Imazu Station opened at this location on the Hanshin Main Line on 19 December 1926. It was also on this date that the original Imazu station to the east was renamed to Kusugawa Station.

Originally a surface-level station, the tracks once continued onto the Hanshin Main Line. This configuration was abolished after 1949 after a runaway train ran from the Imazu Line to the Hanshin Main Line at Kusugawa station.

Service was suspended owing to the Great Hanshin earthquake in January 1995. Restoration work on the Hanshin Main Line took 7 months to complete.

The station was shifted to an elevated structure on 3 March 2001.

Station numbering was introduced on 21 December 2013, with the Hanshin station being designated as station number HS-16.

In 2019, the platforms were extended to the west by about 10 meters. This was done to enable a stop for 8-car long through services to and from the Kintetsu Nara Line.

Gallery

Hankyu Imazu Line

Layout 
The station is served by a single dead-end elevated island platform serving two tracks.

History 
Imazu Station opened on the Hanshin Main Line on 18 December 1926.

The tracks from the Hankyu Line ran through to the Hanshin Main Line until 1949, when an air compressor failure caused a runaway train to run from the Hankyu Line to the Hanshin Main Line. The trainset, a Hankyu 600 series, continued for about 700 meters east until it hit the platforms at Kusugawa Station.

The Imazu Line was damaged by the Great Hanshin earthquake in January 1995. Restoration work on this line took a few days to complete, which the entire southern portion re-opening for service on 5 February 1995.

The current elevated platforms opened on 16 December 1995.

Station numbering was introduced on 21 December 2013, with the station being designated as station number HK-21.

Gallery

Surroundings
Jogan-ji
Japan National Route 43

See also
List of railway stations in Japan

Notes

References

External links

 Hankyu station website 
 Hanshin station website 

Railway stations in Hyōgo Prefecture
Railway stations in Japan opened in 1926
Hankyu Railway Imazu Line
Stations of Hankyu Railway
Hanshin Main Line
Nishinomiya